Badmaash is a 2016 Indian Kannada romantic thriller film directed by Akash Srivatsa and produced by Ravi Kashyap. The film features Dhananjay and Sanchita Shetty in lead roles besides Achyuth Kumar, Prakash Belawadi and B. Suresha playing key supporting roles. The film's score and the soundtrack are composed by Judah Sandhy whilst the cinematography is by Shreesha and editing by Srikanth.

Plot 
Vijay, an intelligent man, and Priya, who teaches Indian culture to people in unique ways, fall in love and everything is perfect, until a person comes between them. Then Vjay tries to win back his love.

Cast
 Dhananjay as Dhanu
 Sanchita Shetty as Priya 
 Achyuth Kumar
 Prakash Belawadi
 Ramesh Bhat
 Suchendra Prasad
 M. S. Umesh
 Vijanath Biradar
 Jahangir
 Ithi Acharya
 Pannaga Bharana
 B. Suresha as Media baron
 Ramesh Pandit
 Lakshmi Anand
 Ram Manjjonaath
 Bangalore Nagesh
 Nagabhushan
 Valerian Menezes

Release
The film is due for release on 18 November 2016 across Karnataka. Prior to its release, as a part of the promotion, the film team took the traditional way by hiring Autorickshaws and with the horn speakers installed on them. A team of college students volunteered themselves to promote the film across 29 districts of Karnataka.

Soundtrack

Judah Sandhy has composed the score and soundtrack for the film. The audio was released on 20 June 2016 in Bangalore with 6 young film directors Pawan Kumar, Pawan Wadeyar, Santhosh Ananddram, S. Krishna, Anup Bhandari and Chetan Kumar releasing the songs. The soundtrack consists of 8 songs and one instrumental track and the lyrics are penned by Jayanth Kaikini, Yogaraj Bhat, Chetan Kumar and the director Akash Srivatsa. The song "Hare Rama" sung by Raghu Dixit was released online and comprises 108 different names of Lord Rama.

References

External links
 
 @Badmaash_movie twitter

2016 films
2010s Kannada-language films
Indian romantic thriller films
2010s romantic thriller films
Films directed by Akash Srivatsa